Catamola funerea is a species of snout moth in the genus Catamola. It was described by Francis Walker in 1863. It is found in Australia.

References

Moths described in 1863
Epipaschiinae